Izzy Stradlin and the Ju Ju Hounds is the debut solo album by American rock and roll musician Izzy Stradlin, released after his departure from Guns N' Roses. It is his only album under the Ju Ju Hounds moniker.

Overview
Released in 1992, Izzy Stradlin and the Ju Ju Hounds spawned two Top 20 rock radio hits: "Shuffle It All" and "Somebody Knockin'." The album was mixed in Copenhagen.

Critical reception
Trouser Press called the debut "a surprisingly strong album that dramatically shows the rootsy sensibility [Stradlin] brought to G n’ R. It sounds like a good Keith Richards solo album (and is actually much better than the album Richards released around the same time)." The album was named 16th album of the year by Kerrang! magazine in 1992.

Track listing
"Somebody Knockin'" (Stradlin, Jimmy Ashhurst) - 3:27
"Pressure Drop" (Frederick Hibbert) - 2:42
"Time Gone By" (Stradlin, Rick Richards) - 3:47
"Shuffle It All" (Stradlin, Ashhurst) - 6:19
"Bucket o' Trouble" (Stradlin) - 2:10
"Train Tracks" (Stradlin) - 4:27
"How Will It Go" (Stradlin) - 3:51
"Cuttin' the Rug" (Stradlin) - 5:01
"Take a Look at the Guy" (Ron Wood) - 4:45
"Come on Now Inside" (Stradlin) - 6:58
"Morning Tea" (hidden bonus track, starts 4:26 into track 10)

Japanese track listing (MVCD-94)
"Somebody Knockin" (Stradlin, Jimmy Ashhurst) - 3:27
"Pressure Drop" (Frederick Hibbert) - 2:42
"Time Gone By" (Stradlin, Richards) - 3:47
"Shuffle It All" (Stradlin, Ashhurst) - 6:19
"Bucket o' Trouble" (Stradlin) - 2:10
"How Much" (Stradlin) - 5:04
"Train Tracks" (Stradlin) - 4:27
"How Will It Go?" (Stradlin) - 3:51
"Cuttin' the Rug" (Stradlin) - 5:01
"Take a Look at the Guy" (Ron Wood) - 4:45
"Come on Now Inside" (Stradlin) - 4:26
"Morning Tea" - 2:35 (presented as hidden bonus track on US version, but indexed as separate track on Japanese CD)

Personnel
Izzy Stradlin - vocals, guitar, harmonica, percussion
Rick Richards - lead guitar, percussion, backing vocals
Jimmy Ashhurst - bass guitar, backing vocals
Charlie "Chalo" Quintana - drums, percussion, backing vocals

Additional personnel
Ian McLagan - Hammond B-3 (on tracks 1, 4, 5, 7, 8, and 9), piano (on track 9)
Craig Ross - guitar (on track 1)
Doni Gray - drums, vocal harmony (on track 10)
Nicky Hopkins - piano (on track 10)
Ron Wood - guitar, vocals (on track 9)
Marc Ford (uncredited) - guitar (on track 1)

Charts

Tour

References

1992 debut albums
Izzy Stradlin albums
Albums produced by Eddie Ashworth
Geffen Records albums